Chaetothyriothecium elegans is a species of fungi in the family Microthyriaceae. It is found in  central Thailand.

References

External links 

 

Dothideomycetes
Fungi described in 2014
Biota of Thailand